Julia Sebutinde is a Ugandan judge serving her second term on the International Court of Justice following her re-election on November 12, 2020.  She also is the current chancellor of Muteesa I Royal University a university owned by Buganda kingdom. She has been a judge on the court since March 2012. She is the first African woman to sit on the ICJ. Before being elected to the ICJ, Sebutinde was a judge of the Special Court for Sierra Leone. She was appointed to that position in 2007.

Background
She was born in the Central Region of Uganda to a civil servant and a housewife with the Semambo surname. She attended the Lake Victoria Primary School in Entebbe in the 1960s. She then joined Gayaza High School and later King's College Budo, before entering Makerere University to study law. Sebutinde graduated with a Bachelor of Laws in 1977. She obtained the Diploma in Legal Practice from the Law Development Center in Kampala in 1978. In 1990, she enrolled at the Edinburgh Law School, University of Edinburgh for her Master of Laws, graduating in 1991. In 2009, in recognition of her body of work and contribution to international justice, she was awarded an honorary Doctor of Laws by the University of Edinburgh.

Work history

In Africa
Julia Sebutinde first worked in the Ministry of Justice in the Government of Uganda from 1978 until 1990. After graduating from the University of Edinburgh in 1991, she worked in the Ministry of the Commonwealth in the United Kingdom. She later joined the Ministry of Justice in the Republic of Namibia, which had just attained Independence at that time. In 1996, she was appointed Judge of the High Court of Uganda. In that capacity, she presided over three commissions of inquiry related to the following government departments:
 Corruption in the Uganda Police
 Corruption in the Uganda People's Defence Force
 Corruption in the Uganda Revenue Authority

At the Special Court on Sierra Leone
In 2005 Justice Julia Sebutinde was appointed, with secondment from the Uganda government, to the Special Court on Sierra Leone, established by the United Nations. She was later appointed the Presiding Judge in Courtroom II, at that time responsible for hearing the case against former Liberian strongman, Charles Taylor. In that position she refused to attend a disciplinary hearing against Taylor's lawyer, a behaviour which amounts to serious judicial misconduct, but that remained unsanctioned by the Special Court for Sierra Leone.

At the International Court of Justice
In the ICJ judges election, 2011, Sebutinde was one of eight candidates for five vacant judicial seats on the International Court of Justice, having been nominated by the national groups of Croatia, Denmark, and Uganda in the Permanent Court of Arbitration. In the election, a successful candidate needs an absolute majority of votes both in the United Nations General Assembly and in the United Nations Security Council. On the first day of voting, four candidates were elected but the fifth position was not filled. When voting adjourned, Abdul Koroma, the incumbent from Sierra Leone, had received 9 votes out of 15 in the Security Council, with 8 votes needed to elect. Over in the General Assembly, after five rounds of voting, Julia Sebutinde, the contender, had received 97 votes out of 193, with 97 votes needed to elect. When balloting resumed on 13 December 2011, Sebutinde received an absolute majority of votes in both the Security Council and the General Assembly, and thus was declared elected.

Other responsibilities
Julia Sebutinde is married to John Bagunywa Sebutinde and together they are the parents of two daughters. She is reported to love music, soccer and swimming. She enjoys Indian cuisine and spicy food. Justice Sebutinde is the Chancellor of the International Health Sciences University, in Kampala, a position she has held since 2008.

See also
 Solome Bossa
 Catherine Bamugemereire
 Esther Mayambala Kisaakye
 List of university leaders in Uganda

References

External links
  Julia Semambo Sebutinde Gets Edinburgh Doctorate
 Justice Sebutinde Nears World Court Job

Living people
People from Wakiso District
Makerere University alumni
Alumni of the University of Edinburgh School of Law
International Court of Justice judges
Ugandan judges
Ugandan women lawyers
People educated at Gayaza High School
People educated at King's College Budo
1954 births
Members of the Permanent Court of Arbitration
Special Court for Sierra Leone judges
Justices of the High Court of Uganda
Ugandan women judges
Academic staff of Clarke International University
Ugandan judges of United Nations courts and tribunals
Ugandan judges of international courts and tribunals
21st-century women judges